The 1987 Colonial Athletic Association baseball tournament was held at The Diamond, home field of Richmond in Richmond, Virginia, from May 14 through 17.  The event determined the champion of the Colonial Athletic Association for the 1987 season.  The winner of the tournament, fourth-seeded , earned the CAA's automatic bid to the 1987 NCAA Division I baseball tournament.

Format and seeding
The CAA's six teams were seeded one to six based on winning percentage from the conference's round robin regular season.  They played a double-elimination tournament with first round matchups of the top and bottom seeds, second and fifth seeds, and third and fourth seeds.  The new format was a result of American discontinuing baseball, leaving the league with six teams.

Bracket and results

Most Valuable Player
Gary Smith was named Tournament Most Valuable Player.  Smith was a pitcher for East Carolina.

References

Tournament
Colonial Athletic Association Baseball Tournament
Colonial Athletic Association baseball tournament
Atlantic 10 Conference baseball tournament
Baseball in Virginia
College sports in Virginia
History of Richmond, Virginia
Sports in Richmond, Virginia
Sports competitions in Virginia
Tourist attractions in Richmond, Virginia